Alexander Johnson Farmer (May 9, 1877 – March 5, 1920), was a professional baseball player who played catcher for the Brooklyn Superbas during the 1908 season, appearing in twelve games with a .167 batting average.

External links

1877 births
1920 deaths
Major League Baseball catchers
Brooklyn Superbas players
Baseball players from New York (state)
New London Whalers players
Providence Grays (minor league) players